The men's 400 metres at the 2012 World Junior Championships in Athletics will be held at the Estadi Olímpic Lluís Companys on 10, 11, and 12 July.

Medalists

Records
, the existing world junior and championship records were as follows.

Results

Heats
Qualification: The first 2 of each heat (Q) and the 8 fastest times (q) qualified

Semi-final
Qualification: The first 2 of each heat (Q) and the 2 fastest times (q) qualified

*Alphas Leken Kishoyian had originally finished in 48.39, the last in his heat, but, since the starter's gun had fired before he settled in his blocks, a rerun was ordered in which he had to run by himself faster than 46.49, the time of the last fastest loser. He succeeded and was given the place in the final.

Final

Participation
According to an unofficial count, 62 athletes from 45 countries participated in the event.

References

External links
WJC12 400 metres schedule

400 metres
400 metres at the World Athletics U20 Championships